The Party! Party! Party! Party was a short-lived joke political party in the Australian Capital Territory, Australia. Its candidates—Amanda Call and Shane McMillan—ran only in the 1989  election for the Australian Capital Territory Legislative Assembly, receiving a total of 979 votes (0.69% of the vote). It was created as a joke since the creators did not believe in self-government when it became legal in ACT.

As a result of the lax party registration laws that allowed this party and other similar parties (for example the Sun Ripened Warm Tomato Party and the Surprise Party) to stand candidates, the electoral legislation in the Australian Capital Territory was changed in 1991 to provide that parties must have 100 members and a constitution before they could register. This stopped people from registering joke parties just for the fun of it.

References 

Defunct political parties in the Australian Capital Territory
Joke political parties in Australia
Political parties established in 1989
1989 establishments in Australia
Political parties with year of disestablishment missing